Flavio Cipolla and Paolo Lorenzi were the defending champions but decided not to participate.
Nicholas Monroe and Maciek Sykut won the final against Marcel Felder and Frank Moser 2–6, 6–3, [10–5] to win the title.

Seeds

Draw

Draw

References
 Main Draw

Seguros Bolivar Open Barranquilla - Doubles
2012 Doubles